Christopher Williams may refer to:

Artists
Christopher Williams (American artist) (born 1956), artist and photographer
Christopher Williams (Welsh artist) (1873–1934)
Christopher Williams, comic book illustrator known as ChrisCross
Christopher Williams (born 1951), British cartoonist who uses the name Kipper Williams

Sportsmen
Christopher Williams (bobsleigh) (1927–2012), British bobsledder
Christopher Williams (cricketer) (born 1954), Australian cricketer
Christopher Williams (cyclist) (born 1981), Australian cyclist
Christopher Williams (soccer) (born 1984), American soccer player
Christopher Williams (sprinter) (born 1972), Jamaican athlete

Others
C. J. F. Williams (1930–1997), English philosopher
Christopher Williams (academic) (born 1952), English academic
Christopher Williams (singer) (born 1967), singer-songwriter
Christopher Harris Williams (1798–1857), U.S. congressman from Tennessee
Christopher Sapara Williams (1855–1915), first indigenous Nigerian lawyer

See also
Christopher Hodder-Williams (1926–1995), English writer
Chris Williams (disambiguation)
Kris Williams (disambiguation)